The 2005–06 season was the 49th season in RK Zamet’s history. It is their 5th successive season in the Dukat 1.HRL, and 29th successive top tier season.

Competitions

Overall

First team squad

Goalkeeper
 1  Damir Bobanović
 12  Ivan Stevanović
 16  Igor Saršon

Wingers
RW
 6  Dario Černeka
 8  Ivan Vrkljan
  Vladimir Gruičić
LW
 4  Mateo Hrvatin
 14  Marko Erstić 

Line players
 11  Adnan Kamberović
 15  Mladen Prskalo
 19  Marin Sakić
 20  Damir Bogdanović

Back players
LB
 3  Marko Bagarić
 5  Jakov Gojun
 9  Ivan Ćosić

CB
 6  Marijan Bašić
 14  Željko Gulin
 17  Marjan Kolev
 18  Mladen Laskač
RB
 7  Milan Uzelac (captain)
 13  Vedran Banić
 19  Milan Kosanović

Technical staff
  President: Petar Bracanović 
  Sports director: Damir Bogdanović (director-player)
  Technical director: Marin Miculinić
  Club Secretary: Daniela Juriša
  Head Coach: Boris Dragičević (until 27 Mar 2006)
  Head Coach: Mladen Prskalo (from 27 Mar 2006)
  Assistant Coach: Alen Kurbanović 
  Fitness Coach:  Sergio DePrivitellio
  Fizioterapist: Branimir Maričević
  Tehniko: Williams Černeka

Dukat 1.HRL

Group B League table

Source: Rk-zamet.hr

Matches

Championship play-offs League table

Matches

External links
HRS
Sport.net.hr 
Rk-zamet.hr

References

RK Zamet seasons
Handball in Croatia